Emese Barka (born 4 November 1989 in Budapest) is a Hungarian freestyle wrestler. She won the bronze medal in the 55 kg division at the 2013 World Wrestling Championships. She won a gold medal in the 58 kg at the 2015 European Games.

In March 2021, she competed at the European Qualification Tournament in Budapest, Hungary hoping to qualify for the 2020 Summer Olympics in Tokyo, Japan.

References

1989 births
Living people
Hungarian female sport wrestlers
European Games gold medalists for Hungary
European Games medalists in wrestling
Wrestlers at the 2015 European Games
World Wrestling Championships medalists
Universiade medalists in wrestling
Universiade bronze medalists for Hungary
European Wrestling Championships medalists
Medalists at the 2013 Summer Universiade
Sport wrestlers from Budapest
20th-century Hungarian women
21st-century Hungarian women